Freshfields Bruckhaus Deringer LLP (informally Freshfields, or FBD) is an international law firm headquartered in London, and a member of the Magic Circle. The firm has 28 offices in 17 jurisdictions across Asia, Europe, the Middle East and North America. It advises national and multinational corporations, financial institutions and governments.

History
Freshfields Bruckhaus Deringer was created in 2000 when U.K.-based Freshfields merged with the two law firms, Germany-based Deringer Tessin Herrmann & Sedemund and Germany-and-Austria-based Bruckhaus Westrick Heller Löber.

Dubbed as the oldest firm within the Magic Circle, Freshfields' origins arguably go back to around 1716, when Thomas Woodford began to practise law. Woodford was succeeded in his practice in 1730 by William Wall, who was succeeded in turn in 1743 by Samuel Dodd. That same year, Dodd was appointed attorney to the Bank of England. In 1788, Winter and Kaye began advising Sir Richard Arkwright, inventor of the water frame. When James William Freshfield joined in 1800, Dodd had died and the Freshfields family became the dominant force in the law firm. Dodd's appointment is treated by Freshfields as the firm's foundation date.

The firm changed its name on numerous occasions as different partners joined or left. In 1800, James William Freshfield (1775–1864) was the first member of the Freshfield family to become a partner, and the firm became known as Winter, Kaye, Beckwith & Freshfield. Following further name changes, it became Freshfield & Son in 1825, and eventually Freshfields 1868–76, Freshfields & Williams 1876–98, Freshfields 1899–1918, Freshfields & Leese 1918–1921, Freshfields, Leese & Munns 1921–1945, and Freshfields 1946–2000. The last member of the Freshfield family to be a partner, another James William Freshfield, retired in 1927.

Bruckhaus Westrick Heller Löber traces its origins back to Hamburg in 1840. At the time of its 2000 merger with Freshfields, the firm was one of the two largest law firms in Germany. Deringer Tessin Herrmann & Sedemund was founded in 1962 by Arved Deringer and Claus Tessin and was based in Cologne from 1970 to 2000.

In 2019, the firm became the first non-US law firm to raise the salaries of newly qualified junior lawyers in the United Kingdom to £100,000, then £125,000 in 2022.

In September 2020, Freshfields announced Georgia Dawson as its new senior partner after time leading the firm’s Asia operations. In October 2022, the firm announced the appointment of Jake Reynolds as its head of Client Sustainability and Environment to support energy transition, human rights, corporate governance, climate change and sustainable finance.

Emblem
The first James William Freshfield (1775–1864) adopted the crest of John Freshfield of Norwich as his own, having seen it as a boy. It was later used as the firm's mark. The emblem represents St Michael, depicted as an angel with a spear.

Controversies 
In 2019, the firm faced questioning by the Solicitors Regulation Authority over its review into how UBS dealt with a rape complaint.

Since 2017, German prosecutors have twice raided Freshfields’ Frankfurt offices to investigate the phantom-trading fraud, known as cum ex fraud, which the German government estimates cost its treasury more than 5 billion euros. Freshfields Bruckhaus Deringer gave tax advice, which was used to justify its legality. In November 2019, the firm's former head of international tax, Ulf Johannemann, was arrested and charged with tax fraud. Then in June 2020, a second former partner was charged with aiding and abetting tax evasion in the scandal.

In 2020, the firm was also discovered to have had historic ties to the Atlantic slave trade. In particular, the firm's name founder, James William Freshfield, financially benefited from slavery by acting as a trustee and owner-in-fee for several slave-owners.

Notable Freshfields attorneys 
 
 Bim Afolami
 Arved Deringer
 Dame Sarah Falk
 Douglas Freshfield
 Henry Ray Freshfield
 John Lamont
 Chris Mort
 Mark Okerstrom
 John Parkinson
 Benito Romano
 Sir Anthony Salz
 Timothy A. Wilkins
 Sir Nicholas Young
 Alma Zadić

See also
List of largest law firms by profits per partner

References

Further reading

External links

Law firms of the United Kingdom
1743 establishments in England
Law firms based in London
Law firms established in 2000
Foreign law firms with offices in the United States
Foreign law firms with offices in Hong Kong
Foreign law firms with offices in Japan
Foreign law firms with offices in the Netherlands
British companies established in 1743
Multinational companies headquartered in the United Kingdom
Law firms established in 1743